The 2009 Croatian Cup Final was a two-legged affair played between Hajduk Split and Dinamo Zagreb. 
The first leg was played in Zagreb on 13 May 2009, while the second leg on 28 May 2009 in Split.

Dinamo Zagreb won the trophy after the penalty shoot-out after was an affair finished on aggregate result of 3–3.

Road to the final

First leg

Second leg

External links
Official website 

2009 Final
GNK Dinamo Zagreb matches
HNK Hajduk Split matches
Cup Final
Croatian Cup Final 2009